Dionysius Zbyruyskyy (worldwide Dmitry Hrytskovych) (died 18 November 1603) was a Bishop of the Ruthenian Uniate Church. From 1585, he was Orthodox Bishop of Kholm, and from 1595, of the Uniate Catholic bishop of Byzantine Rite.

Biography 

Dionysius Zbyruyskyy, the world's Dmitry Hrytskovych was a customs clerk in Krasnystaw. He was married to Anna Ilyashevych, daughter of Chełm Bishop Zacharias Ilyashevych. He had a son, Michael.

The first written mention of the nomination of Dionysius in Chełm is dated on 25 October 1585 and again in 24 November 1585. As bishop of Kholmsk, Dionysius took part in preparatory synods about the union with the Roman Church. On 22 June 1595, Dionysius put his signature to the joint document Ruthenian hierarchs, which they turned to Pope Clement VIII, expressing a desire to conclude a union. From 1595 up to his death in 1603, he was the first Ukrainian Catholic bishop of the Kholm Eparchy.

References 

 Acts, yzdavaemыe Vylenskoyu Arheohrafycheskoyu kommyssieyu, 1892. S. CLIV-CLV. 
 Blazejowskyj D. Hierarchy of the Kyivan Church (861-1996). - Lviv: bricklayer, 1996. - S. 300.

Year of birth missing
1603 deaths
People from Krasnystaw
Converts to Eastern Catholicism from Eastern Orthodoxy
Eastern Orthodox bishops in the Polish–Lithuanian Commonwealth
Bishops of the Uniate Church of the Polish–Lithuanian Commonwealth
Ukrainian Eastern Catholics